Buddhist painting,  in a broad sense, refers to Buddhist paintings in general, including Buddhist biographies, Jataka tales, Pure Land variant paintings (such as Taima mandala), Raigō, Buddhist narrative paintings such as the Two Rivers White Path and Six Paths paintings, Ancestors biographies, Emaki, E-toki, Ancestors drawings, Chinsō portraits of Zen monks, and portraits of ordinary monks. Chinsō, portraits of Zen monks, and portraits of ordinary monks.

Narrowly defined, a painting used in the worship and rituals of Buddhism, especially esoteric sects. Paintings (single or group) depicting the Buddha (Tathāgata), Bodhisattvas, ancient Indian gods, Chinese and Japanese gods, and other deities worshipped in Buddhism, as well as Mandala of the Two Realms, Mandala of the Separate Realms, etc.).

Buddhist paintings include not just framed paintings but also include mandalas, hanging scrolls, and prints

See also 

 Kirikane - The decorative techniques of Buddhist painting handed down from the Asuka period
 Silken Painting of Emperor Go-Daigo

References

Buddhist art
Buddhist paintings